Groundhopping is a hobby that involves attending matches at as many different stadiums or grounds as possible. Participants are known as groundhoppers, hoppers or travellers. Groundhopping is largely a football-related pastime. Generally, groundhoppers are football fans who usually have a neutral opinion regarding football clubs and try to attend as many football games in as many football stadiums or venues as possible, seeing the whole process as a leisure activity.

History 
The term 'groundhopping' originates from the late 1980's and consists of the to English words 'ground' and 'to hop'. From the late 1980s fans in Germany started ground-hopping as well. Currently it is especially popular in the United Kingdom, Germany, the Netherlands, Belgium, Sweden and Norway.

Organisation 
Generally, groundhopping is not officially organised. However, there are some formal organisations for groundhoppers, including The 92 Club in England, which consists of groundhoppers who have visited matches in all stadiums of the Premier and Football League. With this there are also (mostly) charity based races to see who can go round the 92 Football League Stadia in the shortest amount of time, initially being called 92 Grounds in 92 Hours, the current record is 72 hours, set by four fans of Swindon Town in 2015.

Groundhoppers usually organize themselves as a group of friends or through online forums or social media (e.g. Facebook and Twitter) in particular. Other groundhoppers do not organise with others at all and visit grounds alone by themselves.

Enthusiasts of the hobby sometimes use apps such as Futbology or Europlan to track their progress. The Europlan website also acts as the digital mouthpiece of the Association of Groundhoppers in Germany (German: Vereinigung der Groundhopper Deutschlands; V.d.G.D.)

Rules 
There is no universal set or rules for counting ‘hopped grounds’ Although a generally accepted unwritten rule is that a groundhopper must have seen a full 90-min football match at the ground.

See Also 

 Association football culture
 The 92 Club

References

Association football culture
Australian rules football culture
Cricket culture
Gaelic games culture
Rugby football culture
Sports culture
Observation hobbies